Nicolas Dikoumé (born November 21, 1973) is a Cameroonian former professional footballer who playing as a striker.

Career
Dikoumé was born in Yaoundé. In 2005, after two seasons in Cyprus and seven seasons in Greece, he returned to his home club Canon Yaoundé.

References

1973 births
Living people
Footballers from Yaoundé
Association football forwards
Cameroonian footballers
Super League Greece players
Cypriot First Division players
Canon Yaoundé players
Apollon Smyrnis F.C. players
Xanthi F.C. players
Panelefsiniakos F.C. players
Ethnikos Achna FC players
Doxa Katokopias FC players
Panachaiki F.C. players
Cameroon international footballers
1996 African Cup of Nations players
Cameroonian expatriate footballers
Expatriate footballers in Cyprus
Expatriate footballers in Greece
Cameroonian expatriate sportspeople in Cyprus
Cameroonian expatriate sportspeople in Greece